Frederick Kroetsch is a Canadian director, producer and cinematographer. He is known for Dangerous Breed: Crime. Cons. Cats. which premiered on Peacock in Nov 2022.

Biography & work
Kroetsch graduated with a film production degree from the Mel Hoppenheim School of Cinema at Concordia University.

Kroetsch has worked with broadcasters including: Peacock, CBC, AMI-tv, APTN, Bravo, and Cottage Life as a TV Producer/Host for ShawTV, HelpTV, and CTV 2 for ten years. He has directed 2 seasons of Dr. Savanna: Wild Rose Vet, and ran a unit on History's The Curse of Oak Island.

Kroetsch created and directed Queen of the Oil Patch, a documentary series about two-spirited singer Massey Whiteknife. He also created the web-series Happy Town about his Cousin Jay, who builds things that nobody wants.

Kroetsch was cinematographer on the inaugural season of Anaana's Tent, filmed in Iqaluit. He is also cinematographer and Executive Producer on Wochiigii lo: End of the Peace., which premiered at the Toronto International Film Festival.

Kroetsch is also the cinematographer and Executive Producer on The Secret Society, a feature-length documentary about the world of egg donation, directed by his wife Rebecca Campbell.

In November 2022, Kroetsch created a three-part true crime docuseries Dangerous Breed: Crime. Cons. Cats. about wrestler Teddy Hart, It was produced by Blumhouse Productions and premiered on Peacock.

Selected filmography 
 Queen of the Oil Patch (2018)
 Blind Ambition: The Wop May Story (2021)
 Dangerous Breed: Crime. Cons. Cats (2022), produced by Blumhouse Productions
 Dr. Savanna: Wild Rose Vet

Awards and nominations

References

External links
Frederick Kroetsch @ IMDb

Living people
Canadian documentary film producers
Canadian documentary film directors
Year of birth missing (living people)